GNK Dinamo Zagreb is a professional football club based in Zagreb, Croatia, which plays in the Prva HNL. This chronological list comprises all those who have held the position of manager of the first team of Dinamo Zagreb from 1945, when the first professional manager was appointed, to the present day. Caretaker managers are included, where known. 

The first manager of Dinamo Zagreb was Márton Bukovi, who joined the club along with a number of players from Građanski Zagreb, a club disbanded just after World War II in 1945. Bukovi was in charge from 1945 to 1947 and in the next quarter century after him coaches were mostly his former players from Građanski (Mirko Kokotović, Franjo Glaser, Bernard Hügl, Milan Antolković, Ivan Jazbinšek, Gustav Lechner, Branko Zebec and Stjepan Bobek). There were only four non-Yugoslav managers in the history of the club, Márton Bukovi (1945–47), Karl Mütsch (1948), Osvaldo Ardiles (1999) and Ivaylo Petev (2016–2017). Vahid Halilhodžić is the only non-Croatian ex-Yugoslav manager to take over the team since the breakup of Yugoslavia.

List of managers

 Márton Bukovi (1945–1947)
 Mirko Kokotović (1947)
 Karl Mütsch (1947–1948)
 Franjo Glaser (1948–1949)
 Bruno Knežević (1949)
 Bernard Hügl (1949–1952)
 Milan Antolković (1952–1953)
 Ivan Jazbinšek (1953–1955)
 Bogdan Cuvaj (1955–1956)
 Milan Antolković (1956–1957)
 Gustav Lechner (1957–1959)
 Milan Antolković (1959–1960)
 Márton Bukovi (1960–1961)
 Milan Antolković (1961–1964)
 Vlatko Konjevod (1964–1965)
 Milan Antolković (1965)
 Ivan Jazbinšek (1965–1966)
 Branko Zebec (1966–1967)
 Ivica Horvat (1967–1970)
 Zlatko Čajkovski (1970–1971)
 Dražan Jerković (1971–1972)
 Stjepan Bobek (1972)
 Domagoj Kapetanović (1973)
 Ivan Marković (1973–1974)
 Mirko Bazić (1974–1977)
 Rudolf Belin (1977–1978)
 Vlatko Marković (1978–1980)
 Ivan Marković (1980)
 Miroslav Blažević (1980–1983)
 Rudolf Belin (1983)
 Vlatko Marković (1983)
 Branko Zebec (1984)
 Tomislav Ivić (1984–85)
 Zdenko Kobeščak (1985)
 Miroslav Blažević (1986–1988)
 Josip Skoblar (1988–1989)
 Rudolf Belin (1989)
 Josip Kuže (1989–1990)
 Vlatko Marković (1990–1991)
 Zdenko Kobeščak (1991–1992)
 Vlatko Marković (1992)
 Miroslav Blažević (1992–1994) 
 Ivan Bedi (1994)
 Zlatko Kranjčar (1994–1996)
 Otto Barić (1996–1997)
 Marijan Vlak (1997–1998)
 Zlatko Kranjčar (1998)
 Ivan Bedi /  Hrvoje Braović (1998)
 Velimir Zajec (1998–1999)
 Ilija Lončarević (1999)
 Osvaldo Ardiles (1999)
 Marijan Vlak (1999–2000)
 Hrvoje Braović (2000–2001)
 Ilija Lončarević (2001–2002)
 Marijan Vlak (2002)
 Miroslav Blažević (2002–2003)
 Nikola Jurčević (2003–2004)
 Đuro Bago (2004)
 Nenad Gračan (Sept 1, 2004 – Dec 1, 2004)
 Ilija Lončarević (2005)
 Zvjezdan Cvetković (2005)
 Josip Kuže (Jun 1, 2005 – Nov 5, 2006)
 Branko Ivanković (Nov 6, 2006 – Jan 14, 2008)
 Zvonimir Soldo (Jan 15, 2008 – May 14, 2008)
 Branko Ivanković (Jul 1, 2008 – Nov 24, 2008)
 Marijan Vlak (Nov 24, 2008 – Mar 5, 2009)
 Krunoslav Jurčić (Mar 5, 2009 – May 19, 2010)
 Velimir Zajec (May 25, 2010 – Aug 10, 2010)
 Sreten Ćuk (interim) (Jul 20, 2010)
 Vahid Halilhodžić (Aug 16, 2010 – May 24, 2011)
 Marijo Tot (2011)
 Krunoslav Jurčić (May 26, 2011 – Dec 7, 2011)
 Ante Čačić (Dec 23, 2011 – Nov 26, 2012)
 Krunoslav Jurčić (Nov 26, 2012 – Aug 22, 2013)
 Damir Krznar (interim) (2013)
 Branko Ivanković (Sept 2, 2013 – Oct 22, 2013)
 Zoran Mamić (Oct 22, 2013 – Jul 1, 2016)
 Zlatko Kranjčar (Jul 1, 2016 – Sept 24, 2016)
 Željko Sopić (interim) (Sept 25, 2016 – Sept 28, 2016) 
 Ivaylo Petev (Sept 29, 2016 – Jul 13, 2017) 
 Mario Cvitanović (Jul 13, 2017 – Mar 10, 2018) 
 Nikola Jurčević (Mar 12, 2018 – May 15, 2018) 
 Nenad Bjelica (May 15, 2018 – Apr 16, 2020) 
 Igor Jovićević (Apr 22, 2020 – Jul 6, 2020) 
 Zoran Mamić (Jul 7, 2020 – Mar 15, 2021)
 Damir Krznar (Mar 15, 2021 – Dec 1, 2021) 
 Željko Kopić  (Dec 2, 2021 – Apr 21, 2022)
 Ante Čačić  (Apr 21, 2022 – present)

Honours
The following table lists managers according to trophies won. In seasons when several managers had spells with the club only the manager who was in charge when the title was won is listed. The most successful manager to date was Miroslav Blažević who had four spells with the club (1980–83, 1986–88, 1992–94, 2002–03) and is the only manager to have won all the domestic honours available to Dinamo in both the Yugoslav and Croatian football league systems, leading Dinamo to a total of 6 trophies. 

Ivica Horvat is the only manager who won European silverware with Dinamo, leading them to triumph in the 1967 Inter-Cities Fairs Cup Final, although he was in charge only for the final tie against Leeds United as Branko Zebec, who was in charge throughout the 1966–67 season, had left the club in the summer of 1967. Dinamo's only other European final came five years earlier in the 1962–63 Inter-Cities Fairs Cup, when they were led by Milan Antolković.

Krunoslav Jurčić is the only manager to date to have won two consecutive national titles with Dinamo, winning the 2008–09 and 2009–10 Croatian championships.

Key

CL = Croatian First League
CC = Croatian Cup
CS = Croatian Supercup

YL = Yugoslav First League (defunct since 1991)
YC = Yugoslav Cup (defunct since 1991)
ICFC = Inter-Cities Fairs Cup (defunct since 1971)

Winning managers

References

Dinamo Zagreb
Dinamo Zagreb Managers
GNK Dynamo
GNK